Shawna Gordon (born January 18, 1990) is an American soccer player who plays as a midfielder for Sky Blue FC. She previously played for the Boston Breakers, the Western Sydney Wanderers in Australia, and Umeå IK in the Swedish Damallsvenskan.

Early life
Born in Fontana, California, in San Bernardino County, Gordon was raised in the nearby city of Rancho Cucamonga. She attended Los Osos High School where she played for the varsity soccer team all four years and led the team to two league championships. Gordon was named to the league's first-team four times and was named most valuable player (MVP) as a senior.

Gordon played club soccer for the Arsenal and played in regional and Olympic Development Program (ODP) camps for five years. In 2006, she helped the '90 Cal South ODP team to an ODP national championship title and a second-place finish the following year.

Long Beach State 49ers, 2008–2011
Gordon attended California State University, Long Beach where she played for the Long Beach State 49ers from 2008 to 2011 and helped lead the team to three Big West titles as well as three NCAA Tournament appearances. In 2011, the team advanced to the NCAA Elite Eight for the first time. The same year, Gordon was named Big West Conference Midfielder of the Year.

Club career

2013–14 
In 2013, Gordon signed with the Boston Breakers for the inaugural season of the National Women's Soccer League (NWSL), but did not make an appearance for the club.

Following the close of the 2013 NWSL season, Gordon joined the Western Sydney Wanders FC in Australia's W-League for the 2013–2014 season. In December 2013, she was named W-League Player of the Week after the team's 3–0 win over Perth Glory FC. Gordon made 10 starts for the club and scored one goal. The Wanderers finished in 7th place during the regular season with a  record.

In summer 2014, Gordon joined LA Blues in Los Angeles and helped lead the team to their fourth W-League championship. She scored five goals and served five assists during the season.

In the fall, Gordon joined Umeå IK in Sweden's Damallsvenskan for the 2014 season. She made six appearances for the club. Umeå  finished in sixth place with a  record.

2015–16 
In October 2014, Gordon signed with the NWSL side Sky Blue FC based in New Jersey. Of her signing, head coach Jim Gabarra said, "Shawna is a left-footed midfielder who is a great addition to our team. She is very good at set plays, and she has some good playing experience. Her experience at the professional level makes her someone who will add some nice depth to our team." During the 2015 season, she made 13 appearances for the club with 10 starts. Sky Blue finished in eighth place during the regular season with a  record.

International career
Gordon has represented the United States on the under-17 national team. In 2008, she was called into training camp for the United States women's national under-20 soccer team.

References

External links
 Sky Blue FC player profile
 Western Sydney Wanderers player profile

1990 births
Living people
American women's soccer players
Boston Breakers players
Western Sydney Wanderers FC (A-League Women) players
Umeå IK players
Damallsvenskan players
Expatriate women's footballers in Sweden
Women's association football midfielders
NJ/NY Gotham FC players
Long Beach State Beach women's soccer players
National Women's Soccer League players